Johan Gabriel Oxenstierna af Korsholm och Wasa (28 August 1899 – 18 July 1995) was a Swedish modern pentathlete and naval officer. He won a gold medal at the 1932 Summer Olympics.

Oxenstierna belonged to one of the oldest noble families of Sweden, which is known from the 13th century. In 1917 he became a Navy officer and in 1932 appointed naval attaché in Paris; upon his return to Sweden he was promoted to lieutenant commander. During World War II he served as a defense attaché in London. His enciphered cables to his government were treacherously passed on to the Germans by a code clerk in Stockholm who deciphered them, becoming a major source of naval intelligence to the Nazi regime. He retired in 1954 in the rank of sea captain.

In 1922 Oxenstierna married Görel Elisabeth Huitfeldt; they had two sons and one daughter. They divorced in 1946, and Oxenstierna remarried the same year.

References

1899 births
1995 deaths
Modern pentathletes at the 1932 Summer Olympics
Olympic modern pentathletes of Sweden
Swedish male modern pentathletes
Olympic gold medalists for Sweden
Swedish nobility
Olympic medalists in modern pentathlon
Sportspeople from Stockholm
Medalists at the 1932 Summer Olympics
Johan Gabriel